Shabnam Majeed is a Pakistani film and TV playback singer.

Personal life
Majeed had four children with her former husband Wajid Ali, a music director. Their son, Naqi Ali (Lucky Ali), died aged seven after falling down the stairs in 2010. She filed for khula (separation from husband) in February 2020. Majeed's brother, Abdul Waheed, was shot dead on 18 November 2020. 12 days later, two arrests were made in connection with the murder investigation.

Career
Shabnam Majeed started learning music at the of 7. Shabnam first gained some fame in Pakistan through her remix of the single Dil Cheez Hai Kya. She has been described as 'one of the most prolific playback singers of Lollywood' by a major English language newspaper, The Express Tribune.

Philanthropy
In 2016, Majeed, in collaboration with Alhamra Arts Council, formed an organisation to teach music to street children. The organisation, called the Lucky Ali Foundation, is named after her late son. She has also formed a charity dedicated to children with drug addiction.

Awards
 PTV Award for Best Singer for the music video 'Anarkali' in 2006.

References

Living people
Pakistani playback singers
Punjabi people
Year of birth missing (living people)
20th-century Pakistani women singers
21st-century Pakistani women singers
PTV Award winners